The Wrong Side Of Goodbye is the 29th novel by American crime author Michael Connelly, and the nineteenth novel featuring Los Angeles Police Department detective Harry Bosch. It was published in 2016.

Plot summary
Semi-retired Harry Bosch is alternating between two investigations. As a private detective, he is summoned by billionaire industrialist Whitney Vance. The elderly, never-married Vance wants Bosch to track down an old girlfriend to know if he has an heir to whom he can leave his fortune. As a volunteer part-time officer for San Fernando, California, Bosch is involved in the search for a serial rapist.

In college, 18 year old Vance had an eight-month romance with 16 year old Vibiana Duarte. Their respective families objected to the couple: Duarte's father disliked that Vance was not Catholic, while Vance's eugenicist father disapproved of his son dating a Mexican. She may have been pregnant when they last saw each other in 1950. Bosch investigates under an order of confidentiality and finds Vance actually had a son, Dominick Santanello, born shortly before his mother's suicide and adopted soon after birth. Santanello was killed in action during the Vietnam War, so Bosch has to inquire further. He discovers Dominick had a daughter who is named Vibiana Veracruz, named for her grandmother. Vibiana Veracruz is alive and active as an artist and a sculptor.

Bosch receives, in the mail, a handwritten will by Vance, giving $10 million to his longtime personal assistant and secretary Ida Forsythe and the remainder of his estate to his heir. Vance names Bosch as the executor. Bosch hires his half-brother Mickey Haller to represent him. When Vance is found dead at his desk, investigators first believed he died of natural causes. However, days later, Bosch is informed that the elderly man was murdered. Noting inconsistencies in the case, Bosch eventually discovers a fraud initiated by Ida Forsythe when she believed Vance was dying. She confesses to killing Vance when he recovered from a short illness, to avoid his discovery of her chicanery. Vibiana Veracruz uses her inheritance from Vance to buy out developers who wanted to rezone her neighborhood so that the neighborhood can remain as an Arts District.

The parallel crimes Harry is investigating were perpetrated by a serial rapist who they have code-named Screen Cutter after his method of entry to victims' homes. Investigation reveals all the victims lived in neighborhoods frequented by Dockweiler, a city code officer. Dockweiler is a former San Fernando police officer known for his misogynistic attitudes. Bosch shoots and wounds Dockweiler, who had taken the police chief and the police captain as hostages. Bosch then has to find and rescue his partner Bella Lourdes, whom Dockweiler had abducted and imprisoned when she too came to suspect him as the Screen Cutter.

References

2016 American novels
Harry Bosch series
Novels set in Los Angeles
American detective novels
Little, Brown and Company books